The following is a list of notable alumnae from Miss Porter's School.

1850s
Eliza Talcott - attended in the 1850s, and went on to become a founder of Kobe College.

1870s
Grace Hoadley Dodge (1873) - established Columbia University Teachers’ College
Nellie Grant (1873) – daughter of U.S. President Ulysses S. Grant and First Lady Julia Grant
Mary Knight Wood  (1875) – American pianist, music educator and composer
Julia Lathrop (1876) – the first woman ever to head a government agency in the United States

1880s
Helen Gilman Noyes Brown (1881) — philanthropist
Edith Hamilton (1886) – Greek Mythology scholar and sister of Alice Hamilton
Alice Hamilton (1888) – first female faculty member of Harvard Medical School, founder of the field of industrial medicine
Theodate Pope Riddle (1888) – architect and founder of Avon Old Farms and Westover School

1890s

Madeline McDowell Breckinridge (1890) – a leader of the women's suffrage movement, a leading Progressive reformer, and great-granddaughter of Henry Clay
Ruth Hanna McCormick (1897) – member of the U.S. House of Representatives from Illinois and the first woman to run for the U.S. Senate
Princess Anastasia of Greece and Denmark-(née Nonie May Stewart) American born-wife of Prince Christopher of Greece and Denmark, the son of King George I of Greece

1910s

Edith Roelker Curtis (1912) – author, historian, and diarist
Dorothy Keeley Aldis (1914) – American children's author and poet
Emily Hale (1916) – speech and drama teacher, and muse of T.S. Eliot

1920s

Helen Coley Nauts (1925) – founder of the Cancer Research Institute
Isabel Morrell Beadleston (1928) – American socialite and wife of politician Alfred N. Beadleston

1930s

Barbara Hutton (1930) – American socialite, dubbed "Poor Little Rich Girl"
Gloria Vanderbilt American artist, author, actress, fashion designer, heiress, and socialite.
Edith Bouvier Beale (1935) – American socialite, cousin of Jacqueline Kennedy Onassis, and subject of the documentary film Grey Gardens.
Anne Cox Chambers (1938) – U.S. Ambassador to Belgium during the Carter administration
Gene Tierney (1938) – Academy Award-nominated actress
Brenda Frazier (1939) – American socialite

1940s

Polly Allen Mellen (1942) – editor of Vogue magazine
Dina Merrill (née Nedenia Hutton) (1943) – actress and American socialite
Letitia Baldrige Hollensteiner (1943) – author and social secretary to Jacqueline Bouvier Kennedy
Jacqueline Bouvier Kennedy Onassis (1947) – former First Lady of the United States
Patience Cleveland (1948) – American actress and published author
Lilly Pulitzer (née Lillian Lee McKim) (1949) – fashion designer and American socialite

1950s

Lee Radziwill (née Bouvier) (1950) – public relations executive for Giorgio Armani, author, and younger sister of Jacqueline Bouvier Kennedy Onassis
Elizabeth Cushman Titus Putnam (1951) – founding president of the Student Conservation Association (SCA) and recipient of the Presidential Citizens Medal
Laura Rockefeller Chasin (1954) – American socialite
Elise Ravenel Wood du Pont (1954) – former First Lady of Delaware and 1984 Republican candidate for the U.S. House of Representatives
Barbara Babcock (1955) – Emmy Award-winning actress for Hill Street Blues
Pema Chödrön (formerly Deirdre Blomfield-Brown) (1955) – Buddhist nun and author; resident director of Gampo Abbey
Edith Kunhardt Davis (1955) – children's author and illustrator, daughter of Dorothy Kunhardt
Agnes Gund (1956) – President Emerita of the Museum of Modern Art and 1997 recipient of the National Medal of Arts

1960s

Mimi Alford (1961) – former White House intern who wrote a book about her affair with John F. Kennedy

1970s

Elizabeth May (1972) – the first elected Green Party Member of Parliament in Canada and leader of the Green Party of Canada
Dorothy Bush Koch (1977) – philanthropist and member of the Bush political family
Sarah Ludlow Blake (1978) – American writer

1980s

Susannah Grant (1980) – director and Academy Award-nominated screenwriter for Erin Brockovich 
Christine Scott Bates (1983) - Savant Military Analyst
Ariane de Vogue (1984) -- CNN reporter and commentator
R. Erica Doyle (1985) -- educator and noted poet
Pippa Tubman Armerding (1986) -- Director of Africa Research Office, Harvard Business School
Gregg Renfrew (1986) -- entrepreneur and founder of Beautycounter
Lisette Bross (1989) -- Chief Strategic Officer at Radar Pictures
Mary Anne Amirthi Mohanraj (1989) – American writer and editor

1990s

Katherine Collins Pope (1990) – president of television at Chernin Entertainment, formerly president of Universal Media Studios, and executive producer of such television series as New Girl, Touch, and Ben & Kate
Kate Bennett (1993) -- CNN White House reporter assigned to Melania Trump
Chrishaunda Lee (1994) – niece of Oprah Winfrey and hostess of the PBS program Animal Attractions Television

2000s

Mamie Gummer (2001) – actress and daughter of actress Meryl Streep
Hayley Petit (2007) – victim of the Cheshire, Connecticut, home invasion murders
Victoria de Lesseps, French-American artist

Fictional alumnae 
 In the 2003 drama Mona Lisa Smile, Joan Brandwyn's (played by Julia Stiles) student file reveals that she attended Miss Porter's School, though the film incorrectly locates it in Pennsylvania.
 In the 2000 drama The Skulls, Chloe (played by Leslie Bibb) is stated to have attended Miss Porter's School by the character Lukas McNamara (played by Joshua Jackson).,ref.
  In the series Mad Men, Sally Draper (played by Kiernan Shipka) attended Miss Porter's.

References

 
Miss Porter's School